Eva-Riitta Siitonen (born 31 May 1940 in Helsinki) is a Finnish politician. She represents the National Coalition Party.

Biography
She was a member of the Finnish parliament between 1983 and 1989, Governor of the Province of Uusimaa between 1990 and 1996 and first female City Manager of Helsinki between 1996 and 2005.

She was a Member of the European Parliament in 2009.

She has B.Sc. (Econ.) from Helsinki School of Economics and Business Administration.

She is Honorary Doctorate of the College of Veterinary Medicine (1995) and Honorary Doctorate of Helsinki School of Economics and Business Administration (2001).

She was also married to Finnish pop singer, Matti "Fredi" Siitonen and the mother of Hanna-Riikka Siitonen, a Finnish singer and actress, and Petri Siitonen, a son that she had from a previous relationship.

EU parliament memberships in (2009)
 Committee on Legal Affairs
 Committee on Women's Rights and Gender Equality
 Delegation for relations with the People's Republic of China

Decorations
Siitonen has received the following decorations:
 Commander of the Order of the White Rose of Finland
 Medal for Military Merit
 Medal for Civil Defence Merit
 Cross of the Finnish War Invalids
 Medal for National Defence Merit
 Helsinki Medal, golden
 Finnish Police Force, Medal for Merit
 Order of Leopold II, Grand Officer (Belgium)
 Order of the Polar Star, Commander first class (Sweden)
 Order of the White Star, 2nd Class (Estonia)

See also
 Timeline of Helsinki, 1990s

References

External links
 
 Official website

1940 births
Living people
Mayors of Helsinki
National Coalition Party politicians
Grand Officers of the Order of Leopold II
Commanders First Class of the Order of the Polar Star
National Coalition Party MEPs
MEPs for Finland 2004–2009
21st-century women MEPs for Finland
Recipients of the Order of the Cross of Terra Mariana, 3rd Class
Women mayors of places in Finland
Recipients of the Order of the White Star, 2nd Class